Brandon Roger Snyder (born November 23, 1986) is an American professional baseball coach and former utility player. Since August 2021, he has been the bullpen catcher for the Washington Nationals of Major League Baseball (MLB). He previously played in MLB for the Baltimore Orioles, Texas Rangers, Boston Red Sox, Atlanta Braves and Tampa Bay Rays.

Career
Snyder attended Westfield High School in Chantilly, Virginia.

Baltimore Orioles
The Baltimore Orioles selected Snyder in the first round, with the thirteenth overall selection, of the 2005 MLB Draft.

Snyder made his MLB debut on September 10, 2010 against the Detroit Tigers. He came in as a defensive replacement in the 9th inning. His first Major League hit, an RBI single, came in the second inning on September 13, 2010, against Toronto Blue Jays pitcher Marc Rzepczynski.

Snyder played six games in two separate stints with the Orioles in 2011.

Texas Rangers
On January 3, 2012, Snyder was traded to the Texas Rangers for cash considerations. He made the Rangers' major-league roster as a backup first baseman and outfielder.

On May 2, 2012, Snyder hit his first Major League home run against Toronto Blue Jays starter Ricky Romero at the Rogers Centre.

On August 2, 2012, Snyder was optioned to Triple-A Round Rock to make room for third baseman Mike Olt.

On December 12, 2012, the Rangers announced that Snyder had signed a minor league contract with an invitation to major league spring training. He was released on March 27, 2013.

Boston Red Sox
On March 31, 2013, Snyder signed a minor-league contract with the Pawtucket Red Sox. His contract was purchased by the Red Sox on June 25, 2013 to take the roster spot of Will Middlebrooks, who was optioned to the minors. Brandon received a World Series ring for his contributions to the Sox in the season. He hit .180 with 2 home runs and 7 RBI’s and 2 doubles in 27 games. Snyder re-signed with the Sox in November, accepting a minor league contract with an invitation to spring training. His contract expired after the 2014 season.

Baltimore Orioles (Second Stint)
Snyder signed a minor league deal with the Baltimore Orioles on April 27, 2015.

Atlanta Braves 
Snyder signed a minor league deal with the Atlanta Braves in November 2015. In June 2016, he was called up to replace the injured Gordon Beckham. On August 7, 2016, the Braves designated Snyder for assignment. On August 9, 2016, he was recalled and optioned to Gwinnett by the Braves.

Washington Nationals
On November 17, 2016, Snyder signed a minor league deal with the Washington Nationals. He elected free agency on November 6, 2017.

Tampa Bay Rays
On December 14, 2017, Snyder signed a minor league contract with the Rays. He was designated for assignment on April 20, 2018. He elected free agency on October 2, 2018.

Washington Nationals (second stint)
On January 8, 2019, Snyder signed a minor league deal with the Washington Nationals. He became a free agent following the 2019 season. On February 12, 2020, it was announced that Snyder had re-signed with the Nationals. He re-signed on a minor league deal on November 2, 2020.

After several months playing for the Class-AAA Rochester Red Wings, Snyder was added to the Nationals' "taxi squad" during a series in Milwaukee in August 2021, shifting into a player-coach role as the team's bullpen catcher, after Brett Austin took a job coaching at North Carolina State University and Henry Blanco temporarily shifted from bullpen coach to bench coach. Snyder officially announced his retirement as a player on October 2, 2021, while continuing to serve as the Nationals' bullpen catcher.

Personal life
Snyder is the son of former major league pitcher Brian Snyder. Snyder's first cousin, Madison Younginer, is also a professional baseball player.

See also

List of second-generation Major League Baseball players

References

External links

1986 births
Living people
Baseball players from Nevada
Major League Baseball first basemen
Major League Baseball third basemen
Baltimore Orioles players
Texas Rangers players
Boston Red Sox players
Atlanta Braves players
Tampa Bay Rays players
Bluefield Orioles players
Aberdeen IronBirds players
Delmarva Shorebirds players
Frederick Keys players
Bowie Baysox players
Norfolk Tides players
Round Rock Express players
Pawtucket Red Sox players
Honolulu Sharks players
Surprise Rafters players
Phoenix Desert Dogs players
Leones de Ponce players
Southern Maryland Blue Crabs players
Gwinnett Braves players
Syracuse Chiefs players
Durham Bulls players
Fresno Grizzlies players
Rochester Red Wings players